"Laid" is the title song from Manchester alternative rock band James's fifth studio album, Laid (1993). Released on 1 November 1993, the song was a commercial success, charting in the United Kingdom, Australia, and the United States, and has received attention as a theme song for the American Pie film series.

Composition and reception
Emotionally evocative and featuring the risqué opening lyrics, "This bed is on fire with passionate love, the neighbours complain about the noises above, but she only comes when she's on top", it quickly gained popularity on American college radio and remains the group's best-known song in the United States. The American release of its music video replaced the ending of its opening lyrics with "she only sings when she's on top" (although Tim Booth is seen to lip-sync the original line, and is accompanied by a subtitle reading "hums"). Today, a number of alternative rock stations, including Boston's RadioBDC, WBOS, Maryland's WRNR-FM, Chicago's WXRT, Missoula's KDTR-FM, Philadelphia's WRFF and suburban New York City's WXPK will play "Laid" with the original controversial line.

The song peaked at number 61 on the US Billboard Hot 100 and number three on the Billboard Modern Rock Tracks chart, in part due to its cult status as a popular college song in the US. The song was more successful in the band's native UK, where it peaked at number 25, becoming the band's ninth top-40 hit.

One of the Three, the 'unofficial archive of the band James', has said this of the song:

Usage in American Pie
In the late 1990s and early 2000s, the song gained additional exposure and popularity when it was used as the theme song for the American Pie films starring Jason Biggs and Seann William Scott. A cover by Matt Nathanson was recorded exclusively for the third film American Wedding, and was later included on the first spin-off American Pie Presents: Band Camps soundtrack after previously only being in the first two films' trailers. When performed by Matt Nathanson live he often creates a lot of banter over the vocals after the second verse, where he encourages the audience to sing along with him. The seventh installment in the franchise, The Book of Love, contains a new cover of "Laid" by singer Aidan Hawken; as of 2012, it had yet to be released on any album or as a single. The eighth film, American Reunion, features the original version by James played during the film for the first and only time in the series' history.

Track listings

UK CD1 and European CD single
 "Laid"
 "Wah Wah Kits"
 "The Lake"
 "Seconds Away"

UK CD2
 "Laid"
 "Five-O"
 "Say Something"
 "Sometimes"

UK 7-inch and cassette single
 "Laid"
 "Wah Wah Kits"

US cassette single
A1. "Laid" – 2:36
B1. "Say Something" (preview) – 0:50
B2. "Sometimes" (preview) – 1:00
B3. "Low Low Low" (preview) – 0:56

Charts

Certifications

Covers
"Laid" was covered by New Orleans alt-rock band Better Than Ezra on their 2005 greatest hits compilation. It has been covered by the Butch Walker-led band 1969 on a hidden track on their album Maya, and has also been covered by Thomas Ian Nicholas (an actor playing Kevin Myers in the American Pie franchise) on his Tnb EP. English band Palma Violets performed a version of the song in July 2015 for The A.V. Club A.V. Undercover series.

References

James (band) songs
1993 singles
1993 songs
American Pie (film series)
Better Than Ezra songs
Fontana Records singles
Song recordings produced by Brian Eno